Othman Yahya Alhaj Hassan (born 7 January 1994), commonly known as Rangi, is a Saudi Arabian-born Chadian professional footballer who plays as a striker for Bahraini club Sitra.

On 7 September 2022, Alhaj joined Bahraini side Sitra on a free transfer.

References

External links

1994 births
Living people
Sportspeople from Jeddah
Chadian footballers
Association football forwards
Jeddah Club players
Al-Ahli Saudi FC players
Al-Fayha FC players
Al-Ain FC (Saudi Arabia) players
Sitra Club players
Saudi First Division League players
Saudi Professional League players
Bahraini Premier League players
Expatriate footballers in Bahrain